Tycoon is the second studio album by melodic hardcore band No Trigger. It was released almost six years after their first full-length album, Canyoneer.

Track listing

Personnel
Tom Rheault – vocals 
Tom Ciesluk – bass
Mike Ciprari – drums
Mike Przygoda – guitar
Jon Strader – guitar

References

External links
 Tycoon product page at No Sleep Records

2012 albums
No Trigger albums
No Sleep Records albums